Răzvan Tincu (born 15 July 1987) is a Romanian footballer who plays as a defender for Politehnica Iași.

Career statistics

Club

Honours
Studențesc Iași
Liga II: 2011–12

Concordia Chiajna
Cupa Ligii runner-up: 2015–16

Sepsi OSK
Cupa României: 2021–22

References

External links

1987 births
Living people
Sportspeople from Satu Mare
Romanian footballers
Association football defenders
Liga I players
Liga II players
FC Politehnica Iași (2010) players
FC Botoșani players
CS Concordia Chiajna players
Sepsi OSK Sfântu Gheorghe players
Cypriot First Division players
Doxa Katokopias FC players
Romanian expatriate footballers
Romanian expatriate sportspeople in Cyprus
Expatriate footballers in Cyprus